The 2011 Brno Superbike World Championship round was the eighth round of the 2011 Superbike World Championship. It took place on the weekend of July 8–10, 2011 at the Masaryk Circuit, near Brno, Czech Republic.

Results

Superbike race 1 classification

Superbike race 2 classification

Supersport race classification

Brno Round
Brno Superbike